Acrogenospora is a genus of fungi in the family Hysteriaceae. Fossil Acrogenospora have been reported from 12 million year old rocks from central England.

Species
Acrogenospora gigantospora
Acrogenospora hainanensis
Acrogenospora novae-zelandiae
Acrogenospora ovalis
Acrogenospora setiformis
Acrogenospora sphaerocephala
Acrogenospora subprolata

References

Hysteriales
Dothideomycetes genera